John Joseph Brennan (July 17, 1879 – February 21, 1964) was an American track and field athlete who competed in the 1908 Summer Olympics. He died in Wisconsin. In 1908 he finished fifth in the long jump event and eighth in the triple jump competition.

References

External links
profile

1879 births
1964 deaths
American male long jumpers
American male triple jumpers
Olympic track and field athletes of the United States
Athletes (track and field) at the 1908 Summer Olympics